In Washington, D.C., United States Numbered Highways comprise 10 current and former highways.


U.S. Highways

See also

References

 
US